The 1949 Drexel Dragons football team represented the Drexel Institute of Technology–now known asDrexel University—as an independent during the 1949 college football season. Led by Otis Douglas in his first and only season as head coach, the Dragons compiled a record of 3–3–1.

Schedule

Roster

References

Drexel
Drexel Dragons football seasons
Drexel Dragons football